de Berghes-Saint-Winoc is a Flemish noble house, currently extinct.

notable members

Princes of Rache

Peter of Berghes-Saint-Winock, lord of Olhain;married to Jeanne of Bailleul.
Philippe I of Berghes-Saint-Winock, Lord of Rache;married to Hélène de Longueval
Philippe II de Berghes-Saint-Winock, Lord of Rache; married to Marie-Françoise of Halewyn
Eugène-Louis de Berghes-Saint-Winock, 1st Prince of Rache; Knight of the Golden Fleece
Charles-Alexandre de Berghes-Saint-Winock, 2nd Prince of Rache;married to Lucie de Brouchoven
 Jean de Berghes Saint-Winoch, became after his marriage the founder of the Viscounts of Arleux-branche.
Adrian of Berghes-Saint-Winock, lord of Olhain 
Jean de Berghes-Saint-Winock, lord of Olhain;married to Antoinette of Rambures
Charles de Berghes-Saint-Winock, lord of Olhain

Viscounts of Arleux

Jean de Berghes-Saint-Winoch;married to Anne de Vicamez; Viscountess of Arleux
Pierre de Berghes-Saint-Winoch, Viscount of Arleux;married to Catherine de Haynin
Philippe III Albert de Berghes-Saint-Winoch, Viscount of Arleux;married to Marie Madelein de Wignacourt
Eustache-Joseph de Berghes-Saint-Winoch, Viscount of Arleux;married to Marie Françoise de Carnin
François, Viscount of Berghes-Saint-Winoch
Charles-Alphonse, Duke of Berghes-Saint-Winoch;married to Victorine, Princesse de Broglie

Others 
 Rudolph de Landas Berghes

See also 
 The Flemish house of Glymes-Berghes, Princes of Grimberghes and Marquesses of Berghes-Sur-le Zoom.

Notes

Belgian noble families